Whisenant is a surname. Notable people with the surname include:

Beranton Whisenant (1979–2017), American lawyer
Edgar C. Whisenant (1932–2001), American engineer and Bible student
John Whisenant (born 1945), American basketball coach
Matt Whisenant (born 1971), American baseball player
Pete Whisenant (1929–1996), American baseball player and coach

See also
Thomas Whisenhant, (1947–2010), American serial killer